Bernd Gabriel (born 5 August 1961) is a German wrestler. He competed in the men's Greco-Roman 62 kg at the 1984 Summer Olympics.

References

External links
 

1961 births
Living people
German male sport wrestlers
Olympic wrestlers of West Germany
Wrestlers at the 1984 Summer Olympics
People from Saarlouis
Sportspeople from Saarland